Arthur R. Butz is an associate professor of electrical engineering at Northwestern University and a Holocaust denier, best known as the author of the pseudohistorical book The Hoax of the Twentieth Century. He achieved tenure in 1974 and currently teaches classes in control system theory and digital signal processing.

Education and career 
Butz attended the Massachusetts Institute of Technology from which he received both his Bachelor of Science and, in 1956, his Master of Science degrees. In 1965, he received his PhD from the University of Minnesota. His doctoral dissertation considered a problem in control engineering.

Holocaust denial
In 1976, Butz published The Hoax of the Twentieth Century: The Case Against the Presumed Extermination of European Jewry, an antisemitic, pseudohistorical book which argues that the Holocaust was a propaganda hoax. From 1980 to 2001, Butz was on the editorial board of the Journal of Historical Review, a publication of the Institute for Historical Review, a Holocaust-denying organization.

Faculty reaction
Butz's Holocaust denial sparked an outrage among the Northwestern University's faculty and community, after the existence of the book was disclosed by The Daily Northwestern in 1977. His views were also criticized by Robert H. Strotz, Northwestern University's then-president at the time of the book's publication. In 1997, Butz drew further criticism after using the university's Internet domain to publish his views.

In 2006, sixty of Butz's colleagues from the Department of Electrical Engineering and Computer Science faculty signed a censure describing Butz's Holocaust denial as "an affront to our humanity and our standards as scholars". The letter also called for Butz to "leave our Department and our University and stop trading on our reputation for academic excellence."

University President Henry Bienen issued a statement condemning Butz' Holocaust denial, but noted that tenure and academic freedom protected Butz from dismissal as he had kept his denialism separate from his work as an instructor.

Debunking
According to the Anti-Defamation League, "some Holocaust deniers argue that Butz's book has never been refuted by mainstream scholars, but in fact many of his arguments were thoroughly debunked" in books by Deborah Lipstadt (Denying the Holocaust, 1993), John C. Zimmerman (Holocaust Denial: Demographics, Testimonies and Ideologies, 2000) and online web sites such as Nizkor Project and www.anti-rev.org. Historian Jacques Kornberg, in a 1995 analysis, found that Butz had provided no evidence to support his claims that the Nuremberg trial defendants were tortured, and that his accusations were instead based on unproven allegations of torture associated with other trials unconnected to Nuremberg, such as the Dachau Military Tribunal.

Removal from Amazon
In 2017, Amazon.com removed the book along with other Holocaust-denying books from its US and UK sites. The ban of the books was requested by the director of the Yad Vashem library, Robert Rozett, who sent an email  directly to Amazon CEO Jeff Bezos.

See also
Criticism of Holocaust denial
Antisemitism
Historical negationism
Holocaust denial

References

External links

1933 births
Living people
Academic scandals
American Holocaust deniers
Engineers from New York City
Northwestern University faculty
Massachusetts Institute of Technology alumni
University of Minnesota College of Science and Engineering alumni
Writers from New York City
Activists from New York City
Control theorists
American electrical engineers
Electrical engineering academics